Iván Ángel Varga (born 23 June 1995) is an Argentine former professional footballer who played as a defender.

Career
Argentine Primera División club Arsenal de Sarandí were Varga's first team, he made his debut for them on 16 February 2015 in a league loss to Estudiantes during the 2015 season. He went onto make ten more appearances in all competitions during the campaign, including two in the 2015 Copa Sudamericana second stage ties against Independiente. He was released by the club in January 2017. Eight months later, Varga joined Primera B Metropolitana side Atlanta. In January 2018, Varga was forced to retire due to a hypertrophic cardiomyopathy heart problem; he subsequently joined Atlanta's coaching staff.

Career statistics

References

External links

1995 births
Living people
Sportspeople from Avellaneda
Argentine footballers
Association football defenders
Argentine Primera División players
Primera B Metropolitana players
Arsenal de Sarandí footballers
Club Atlético Atlanta footballers